Veljko Dovedan (born 1 June 1954) is a Bosnian born-Serbian professional football manager who is the manager of Kategoria Superiore club Bylis.

Honours

Manager
Bylis
Kategoria e Parë: 2018–19

References

External links
Veljko Dovedan at Footballdatabase

1954 births
Living people
People from Travnik
Serbian football managers
Bosnia and Herzegovina football managers
Panachaiki F.C. managers
Niki Volos F.C. managers
FK Sloga Kraljevo managers
FK Slavija Sarajevo managers
KF Bylis Ballsh managers
Serbs of Bosnia and Herzegovina
Expatriate football managers in Greece
Serbian expatriate sportspeople in Greece
Bosnia and Herzegovina expatriate sportspeople in Greece
Expatriate football managers in Albania
Serbian expatriate sportspeople in Albania
Bosnia and Herzegovina expatriate sportspeople in Albania